St. Peter's Chapel is an historic Carpenter Gothic-style Episcopal church building located at 14590 Solomon's Island Road, South, in Solomons, Calvert County, Maryland. Built in 1889, it features the steep roof, lancet windows and board and batten siding typical of Carpenter Gothic churches. In 1900 it joined with Middleham Chapel to form Middleham and St. Peter's Episcopal Parish in the Episcopal Diocese of Maryland. St. Peter's Chapel is still in use today. The parish's current rector is the Rev. David Showers.

References

External links
 Middleham and St. Peter's Episcopal Parish official website

Carpenter Gothic church buildings in Maryland
Churches completed in 1889
19th-century Episcopal church buildings
Episcopal church buildings in Maryland
Churches in Calvert County, Maryland
Churches in Solomons, Maryland
Chapels in the United States